The zazous were the French youth subculture of 1930–1940s, associated with swing music.

Zazou may also refer to:

Hector Zazou, French musician
Samir Zazou, Algerian footballer
Hisham Zazou, Egyptian businessman and politician

French-language surnames